GKN Automotive is a multinational manufacturer of driveline components, all-wheel drive systems and plug-in hybrid systems for the automotive industry. It employs around 27,500 people across 51 manufacturing facilities and 6 technology centres in 20 countries. In 2018, GKN Automotive’s parent company, GKN Ltd, was acquired by Melrose and its automotive business was renamed GKN Automotive. This encompasses both the Driveline and ePowertrain divisions.

GKN Automotive became the world's largest producer of constant-velocity joints (CVJs), which it began manufacturing in the 1960s for early front-wheel drive cars like the original Mini. Its other products include sideshafts, propshafts, modular eDrive systems, multi-mode hybrid transmissions for plug-in hybrid electric vehicles, torque vectoring systems for electric drivelines and a range of all-wheel drive and four-wheel drive systems.

History
GKN (Guest, Keen & Nettlefolds)'s origins date back to 1759 and the founding of the Dowlais Ironworks by the industrialists Thomas Lewis and Isaac Wilkinson. It has changed shape and direction many times along with the engineering industry. The company took part in the railway boom in the early 1800s with its production of iron, then steel in the 1860s and, after the First World War, the automotive industry.

In 1966, after being advised GKN Steel would be nationalised for the second time, GKN  bought CVJ market leaders Birfield Industries with its subsidiaries Hardy Spicer and Laycock Engineering with their interests and subsidiaries in Europe, Japan and the United States to save its BRD subsidiary. This was the start of the company's globalization. GKN established a manufacturing presence in China in 1988. At the same time, GKN Driveline was investing in and growing its business in India, Brazil and Mexico.

(Divisions) Products, Research and Development

CVJ Systems
A CVJ, or constant velocity joint, transfers power from the transmission to the front wheels, allowing articulation and movement for steering and suspension. The three major elements are:  inboard and outboard CVJs, including lubrication and sealing systems, and interconnecting shafts. The inboard joint is a plunging joint that allows the effective length of the sideshaft to adjust due to suspension movement. The outboard joint needs to transfer power effectively through a wide range of angles (up to 53 degrees).

AWD Systems
AWD Systems are for all-wheel drive (AWD) vehicles. GKN Driveline has unique developments for partial or full AWD vehicles. Within AWD Systems, GKN Driveline offers one, two or three-piece high speed propshafts made from steel, aluminium or composite tubes. Forefront example of this technology is used in the custom made to order by Ford Performance for the Ford Focus RS launched in 2016. It utilizes an intelligent torque vectoring AWD system with rear differentials. This AWD system is also used in various vehicles by GM, Volvo and other car manufacturers.

Trans Axle Solutions
Trans Axle Solutions cover an extensive range of Open Differentials, Limited Slip and Locking Differentials, and advanced products like electronic torque vectoring. The wide range of differentials available is used in passenger cars, Sports car (SUVs) and Light truck.

eDrive
The eAxle drive module is a compact, lightweight Gear with an actively controlled wet clutch for electric motor assisted AWD. The eAxle unit for axle split Hybrid electric vehicle incorporates a proprietary disconnect clutch technology, which facilitates on-demand all-wheel-drive (AWD) use and contributes to the overall all-terrain functionality and fuel efficiency.

Electric drive transmissions can transmit up to 300 kW of power, they are available with ratios up to 14:1 and can be matched with E-motors from various suppliers to allow flexible application.

References

Bibliography
Lorenz, Andrew: GKN.The Making of a Business 1759-2009. John Wiley & Sons Ltd (2009)
Jones, Edgar: A History of GKN. Volume One: Innovation & Enterprise 1759-1918. GKN plc (1987)
Jones, Edgar: A History of GKN. Volume Two: The Growth of a Business 1918-1945. GKN plc (1990)
GKN plc factsheet: http://www.gkn.com/media/Documents/GKNfactsheet_final.pdf, 12.08.2011

Manufacturing companies of the United Kingdom